The Bay of Noon is a 1970 novel by the Australian author Shirley Hazzard. It was shortlisted for the Lost Man Booker Prize in 2010.

Synopsis
A young Englishwoman, Jenny, is working in Naples some years after World War II. Alone in the ruined city, she follows up a letter of introduction from an acquaintance, through which she meets Gioconda, a beautiful and gifted writer, and her lover Gianni, a noted Roman film director. Meanwhile, at work she meets Justin, a Scotsman whose inscrutability Jenny finds mysteriously attractive. As Jenny becomes increasingly drawn into the lives of the three, she discovers that the past is not easily forgotten.

References

1970 Australian novels
Little, Brown and Company books
Novels set in Naples